Spratelloides delicatulus, the blue sprat, also known as the delicate round herring, blueback sprat, or piha, is a type of sprat-like fish of Indo-Pacific distribution.

See also
Kudoa thyrsites
List of Lessepsian migrants

References

Clupeidae
Fish of Hawaii
Fish described in 1832